Iron Chef: Quest for an Iron Legend is an American cooking show reboot of Iron Chef and Iron Chef America.  Alton Brown returns to co-host the show with Kristen Kish, and Mark Dacascos again serves as The Chairman.  Contestants challenge the Iron Chefs in a cookoff with a secret ingredient, and in this series, the highest scoring challenger battles with all five Iron Chefs one more time in hopes of becoming an Iron Legend. The series debuted on Netflix on June 15, 2022, for its first season of eight episodes.

Format 
Five new Iron Chefs have been introduced: Curtis Stone, Dominique Crenn, Marcus Samuelsson, Ming Tsai and Gabriela Cámara.  Challenger chefs compete against the Iron Chefs to prepare a dish centered around a secret ingredient revealed by The Chairman.  Hosts Alton Brown and Kristen Kish provide real-time commentary on how the competition proceeds. Each episode has three judges, Nilou Motamed, Andrew Zimmern, and a third guest judge. Unlike prior iterations, Brown and Kish also try the dishes and participate in deliberation with the judges, although their votes are not counted in the final score.  At the end of the season, the highest-scoring challenger returns to face off against all five Iron Chefs in hopes of becoming an Iron Legend and receiving a Golden Knife.

Episodes 
Each episode has three judges, Nilou Motamed, Andrew Zimmern, and a third guest judge.

Production 
In January 2022, Netflix announced that it would reboot the Iron Chef franchise with a new iteration subtitled Quest for an Iron Legend for eight episodes, initially. The release date of June 15, 2022 was announced that May with Alton Brown returning to co-host the show with Kristen Kish and Mark Dacascos reprising as The Chairman.

Tsai, Samuelsson, Crenn, and Stone were previously challengers on Iron Chef America, with Tsai, Samuelsson, and Crenn having also competed on The Next Iron Chef. Past Iron Chefs Masaharu Morimoto and Wolfgang Puck appear as guest judges during the first season. Morimoto was the third Iron Chef Japanese on the original Iron Chef and was one of the Iron Chefs on Iron Chef America, while Wolfgang Puck served as one of the Iron Chefs for the Iron Chef America: Battle of the Masters pilot miniseries before retiring.

Reception 
On the review aggregator website Rotten Tomatoes, 57% of 7 critics' reviews are positive, with an average rating of 5.8/10. Jim Vorel at Paste enjoyed the show appreciating the preserved balance of "patently absurd" and "undeniably impressive" from previous iterations. However, Wenlei Ma disagreed in her review for news.com.au feeling it lacked the weirdness of the original Iron Chef and was too polished, later calling it "soulless" and "not worthy of the Iron Chef name."

References

External links 
 
 

Iron Chef
2020s American cooking television series
2022 American television series debuts
American television series based on Japanese television series
American television spin-offs
Television series reboots
Cooking competitions in the United States
English-language Netflix original programming